Senza Tempo (Timeless in English) is a short film by Italian director Gabriele Muccino, director of L'ultimo bacio (One Last Kiss), Remember Me, My Love (Ricordati di me) with Monica Bellucci and The Pursuit of Happyness with Will Smith. The film is the result of a collaboration between Peroni Nastro Azzurro and Muccino and was shown in cinemas throughout the UK.

Production 
The film was made as a joint production between Peroni's ad agency The Bank and Muccino's company Indiana Production. It is part of Accademia del Film Peroni Nastro Azzurro, which promotes the iconic world of Italian film in the UK by celebrating the principles that have made and continue to make the Italian craft of film-making so unique. Part of the film's creation included giving a group of hand-picked, up and coming film talent the opportunity to learn these principles directly from Muccino himself during the creation of the film.

References

External links 
 Official site

2010 films
British short films
Italian short films
Films set in Rome